Rosalynne Montoya, known professionally as Rose Montoya (born October 10, 1995), is an American model, social media content creator, and transgender rights activist. She began modeling in 2018, and has since modeled for Fenty Beauty, Savage X Fenty, Fluide, Yandy.com, Adore Me, and TOMS Shoes. Montoya, who is a non-binary transgender woman, was featured in 18 LGBTQ+ Policy Makers and Advocates Changing the World by Out Magazine in 2021. In 2022, she was nominated for Favorite TikToker at the 10th annual Queerty Awards.

Early life and education
Montoya was born in October, 1995. She grew up in rural southern Idaho in a family with four siblings. She learned American Sign Language as a child due to her mother working as a sign language interpreter. Her father worked as a worship pastor at their church and her mother worked as a Christian missionary. Montoya realized they were attracted to men in Middle School and outed themselves as gay 2010 in High School. She then began performing in drag shows which led to her coming out as a transgender woman in 2015. She started transitioning on June 23, 2015 and changed her legal name in September 2015. In 2016, she came out as bisexual and, in 2019, as a non-binary transgender woman using both feminine and non-binary gender pronouns.

Montoya graduated in 2015 from Seattle University with a bachelor of arts degree in film studies at 19 years old.

Career 
Montoya worked as a full-time makeup artist and manager at a department store's cosmetics counter until she was laid off during the COVID-19 pandemic in the United States. During this time, she focused on turning her social media platforms into a full-time job. Montoya uses their social media to create educational content regarding transgender issues, experiences, and rights. She has made sponsored posts with FX Networks, New York City Pride, Planned Parenthood, Fenty Beauty, Parade, and Fluide. In 2022, Montoya was nominated for Favorite TikToker at the 10th annual Queerty Awards.

She has spoken and presented on transgender rights at the Philadelphia Trans Wellness Conference, the Downtown Emergency Service Center, the University of Pittsburgh, Stanford University, and Yale University. She launched the educational website The Trans 101 to spread awareness regarding issues faced by transgender people. Montoya is also a board member of the non-profit, Aadya Rising. She was one of the activists featured in Out'''s  18 LGBTQ+ Policy Makers and Advocates Changing the World.

She began modeling in 2018, after they were discovered by the undergarment company TomboyX. She was scouted by Tricia Romani of League Models and InspirationALL Talent  through her TikTok channel and is signed to them for acting and modeling. She has modeled in advertisement campaigns for Savage X Fenty, Yandy.com, Adore Me, Toms Shoes, and oVertone. In June 2021, they were featured on a billboard in New York City as one of the faces of LGBT telehealth group Folx Health's launch campaign for PreP.

 Personal life 
Montoya has spoken publicly about gender-affirming surgeries she underwent, including a breast augmentation, a trachea shave, and a genioplasty. She has also opened up about her experiences living with chronic anxiety and depression.

In March 2021, Montoya had a difficult experience with the Transportation Security Administration at an airport in Phoenix, Arizona. A TikTok video about it received over twenty million views. Montoya said her documentation recognizes her as female, but airport scanners, which categorize travelers as male or female due to genitalia, set off alarms. After disclosing to the TSA attendant that she is transgender, the agent asked if Montoya would prefer to be "scanned as a man instead." Montoya stated that then, after triggering the alarm again, the TSA tried to assign a male agent to pat her down despite her being a woman.

Montoya is polyamorous and frequently uses her platforms to educate people about different relationship structures. Montoya used to be Bob the Drag Queen's metamour and joined him for a podcast episode. She is currently dating two trans men.

 Filmography 

 Television 

 Awards, Nominations, and Honors 

 2021 - One of 18 Latinx Creatives to Follow from Arizona Republic
 2021 - Out Magazine's Out 100 Honoree honoring the magazine's selection of 18 LGBTQ+ Policy Makers and Advocates Changing the World'' in 2021

Notes

References 

Living people
Activists from Idaho
Bisexual entertainers
Bisexual women
Female models from Idaho
Hispanic and Latino American activists
Hispanic and Latino American female models
LGBT Hispanic and Latino American people
LGBT people from Idaho
American LGBT rights activists
LGBT TikTokers
Non-binary activists
Non-binary models
Seattle University alumni
Transgender female models
Transgender non-binary people
Transgender rights activists
Polyamorous people
1995 births